Kiga (also Romanized as Kīgāh and Kīgā) is a village in Sulqan Rural District, Kan District, Tehran County, Tehran Province, Iran. At the 2006 census, its population was 333, in 81 families.

References 

Populated places in Tehran County